Carry On Up the Khyber is a 1968 British comedy film, the 16th in the series of 31 Carry On films (1958–1992). It stars Carry On regulars Sid James, Kenneth Williams, Charles Hawtrey, Joan Sims, Bernard Bresslaw and Peter Butterworth. It is the second of two Carry On film appearances by Wanda Ventham; and Roy Castle makes his only Carry On appearance, in the romantic male lead part usually played by Jim Dale.

Angela Douglas makes her fourth and final appearance in the series. Terry Scott returned to the series after his minor role in the first film of the series, Carry On Sergeant a decade earlier. The film is, in part, a spoof of Kiplingesque movies and television series about life in the British Raj, both contemporary and from earlier, Hollywood, periods. The title is a play on words in the risqué Carry On tradition, with "Khyber" (short for "Khyber Pass") being rhyming slang for "arse".

Plot

Sir Sidney Ruff-Diamond (Sid James) is Queen Victoria's Governor in the Indian province of Kalabar near the Khyber Pass. The province is defended by the feared 3rd Foot and Mouth Regiment, who are said to not wear anything under their kilts. When a soldier, the inept Private Widdle (Charles Hawtrey), is found wearing underpants after an encounter with the warlord Bungdit Din (Bernard Bresslaw), chief of the warlike Burpa tribe, the Khasi of Kalabar (Kenneth Williams) plans to use this information to incite a rebellion in Kalabar. He aims to dispel the "tough" image of the Devils in Skirts by revealing that, contrary to popular belief, they actually wear underpants underneath their kilts.

A diplomatic operation ensues on the part of the British, who fail to publicly prove that the incident was an aberration. The Governor's wife (Joan Sims), in the hope of luring the Khasi into bed with her, takes a photograph of an inspection in which many of the soldiers present are found wearing underpants, and takes it to him. With this hard evidence in hand, the Khasi would be able to muster a ferocious Afghan invasion force, storm the Khyber Pass and capture India from the British; but Lady Ruff-Diamond insists that he sleep with her before she parts with the photograph. He delays on account of her unattractiveness, eventually taking her away with him to Bungdit Din's palace. Meanwhile, the Khasi's daughter, Princess Jelhi (Angela Douglas), reveals to the British Captain Keene (Roy Castle), with whom she has fallen in love, that the Governor's wife has eloped, and a team is dispatched to ensure the return of both her and the photograph.

Disguised as Afghan generals, the interlopers are brought into the palace and, at the Khasi's suggestion, are introduced to Bungdit Din's sultry concubines. Whilst enjoying the women in the harem, they are unmasked amid a farcical orgy, imprisoned, and scheduled to be executed at sunset alongside the Governor's wife. Princess Jelhi aids their escape by disguising them as dancing girls, but during the entertaining of the Afghan generals, the Khasi, contemptuous of an annoying fakir's performance, demands that he see the dancing girls instead. After their disguises are seen through, the British and the Princess flee, but Lady Ruff-Diamond drops the photograph on leaving the palace through the gardens. The group returns to the Khyber Pass to find its guards massacred and their weapons comically mutilated, in a rare (albeit tainted) moment of poignancy.

All attempts to hold off the advancing Afghan invaders fail miserably, and a hasty retreat is beaten to the Residency. The Governor, meanwhile, has been entertaining, in numerical order, the Khasi's fifty-one wives, each one of them wishing to "right the wrong" that his own wife and the Khasi himself have supposedly committed against him. After a browbeating from his wife, Sir Sidney calls a crisis meeting regarding the invasion, in which he resolves to "do nothing". A black tie dinner is arranged for that evening. Dinner takes place during a prolonged penultimate scene, with contrapuntal snippets of the Khasi's army demolishing the Residency's exterior, and the officers and ladies ignoring the devastation as they dine amongst themselves. Shells shaking the building and plaster falling into the soup do not interrupt dinner, even when the fakir's severed - but still talking - head is served, courtesy of the Khasi.

Only Brother Belcher fails to display a stiff upper lip, and breaks his calm by panicking. Finally, at Captain Keene's suggestion, the gentlemen walk outside to be greeted by a bloody battle being waged in the courtyard. Still dressed in black tie, Sir Sidney orders the Regiment to form a line and lift their kilts, this time exposing their (implied) lack of underwear. The invading Afghan army is terrified, and retreats at once.  The gentlemen walk back inside to resume dinner, whilst Brother Belcher notices the Union flag flown by the governor bearing the slogan I'm Backing Britain and calls them "raving mad".

Cast

Sid James as Sir Sidney Ruff-Diamond
Kenneth Williams as The Khasi of Kalabar
Charles Hawtrey as Private James Widdle
Roy Castle as Captain Keene
Joan Sims as Lady Joan Ruff-Diamond
Bernard Bresslaw as Bungdit Din
Peter Butterworth as Brother Belcher
Terry Scott as Sergeant Major MacNutt
Angela Douglas as Princess Jelhi
Cardew Robinson as The Fakir
Peter Gilmore as Private Ginger Hale
Julian Holloway as Major Shorthouse
Leon Thau as Stinghi
Michael Mellinger as Chindi
Wanda Ventham as The Khasi's First Wife
Alexandra Dane as Busti

Production

Writing
The screenplay was written by Talbot Rothwell. Peter Rogers had liked Rothwell's writing so much after he had submitted the script for Carry On Jack that he asked him to become the Carry On staff writer; Rothwell wrote a further nineteen Carry On films.

The film's fictional Highland infantry regiment of the British Army was known as the 3rd Foot and Mouth Regiment. It is a regiment of Highlanders, known locally as "the Devils in Skirts" for their tradition of not wearing anything beneath their kilts. The regimental tartans and bonnet badges designed for the unnamed Highland regiment in the 1960 film Tunes of Glory were rented for the production to kit out Carry On Up the Khyber's 3rd Foot and Mouth Regiment. The pith helmets and webbing were borrowed from the 1964 classic war film, Zulu.

Filming
The movie was shot between 8 April and 31 May 1968. Interiors were filmed at Pinewood Studios, Buckinghamshire. Heatherden Hall, the administrative offices of Pinewood Studios, was used as the governor's residence.

The scenes on the North West Frontier were filmed beneath the summit of Snowdon in North Wales. The lower part of the Watkin Path was used as the Khyber Pass with garrison and border gate. In September 2005, a plaque was unveiled in Snowdonia to mark the spot of where the film was shot.

Release
The film was the second most popular movie at the UK box office in 1969.

Reception
Carry On... Up the Khyber is frequently cited as the best entry in the series. Colin MacCabe, Professor of English at the University of Exeter, labelled this film (together with Carry On Cleo) as one of the best films of all time.

In 1999, it was placed 99th on the BFI's list of greatest British films ever made.

See also
 BFI Top 100 British films

References
Citations

Bibliography

External links 
 
 
 Carry on Up the Khyber at BFI Screenonline
 Filming Carry On Up The Khyber, Snowdonia, 1968 – TV feature, including on-location interviews with Gerald Thomas and Kenneth Williams
 Carry On Up the Khyber at The Whippit Inn 
 3rd Foot & Mouth Recreation Group

1968 films
1960s historical comedy films
1960s parody films
British Empire war films
British historical comedy films
British parody films
Up the Khyber
1960s English-language films
Films directed by Gerald Thomas
Films set in 1895
Films set in the British Raj
Films shot at Pinewood Studios
Films shot in Wales
Films set in India
Films set in Khyber Pakhtunkhwa
Films produced by Peter Rogers
Films with screenplays by Talbot Rothwell
1968 comedy films
1960s British films